CelebriTV is a Philippine television comedy talk show broadcast by GMA Network. Hosted by Ai-Ai delas Alas, Joey de Leon and Lolit Solis, it premiered on September 19, 2015 replacing Startalk. The show concluded on May 21, 2016 with a total of 35 episodes. It was replaced by Laff Camera Action in its timeslot.

Hosts

 Ai-Ai delas Alas
 Joey de Leon
 Lolit Solis

Co-hosts
 Ricky Lo
 Boobsie Wonderland
 Donita Nose

Introducing
 AA (AI-AIssistant, baller)

Segments
 iTalkTalk mo!
 Lolit's Careful Whisper
 Ai Challenge You!
 Kiss-a-Ball
 Eksenadora
 Di Ba Teh!
 Quiz Miz
 CelebriTV Exclusives
 Sabehhh?!?
 Events Pa More!
 Da Who!

Special Edition
 Laugh Laban Na!
 Question-A-Bull
 Sumo-Sobra ka na!
 Pakita mo'ng bet mo!
 Sumayaw, Sumagot
 Notes ko yan!
 Ingli-Sing-It!
 SING'no sya?
 Halo-Halo Hula
 Short Time

Ratings
According to AGB Nielsen Philippines' Mega Manila household television ratings, the pilot episode of CelebriTV earned a 17.6% rating. While the final episode scored a 10.6% rating.

References

2015 Philippine television series debuts
2016 Philippine television series endings
Entertainment news shows in the Philippines
Filipino-language television shows
GMA Network original programming
Philippine television talk shows